That That Is ... Is (Not) is the debut album of Dissolve, released in 1995 through Kranky.

Track listing

Personnel 
Chris Heaphy – guitar
Roy Montgomery – guitar

References

External links 
 

1995 debut albums
Dissolve (band) albums
Kranky albums